Tases, also Tazes or Tasees, was the name of a Maya chiefdom of the northeastern Yucatán Peninsula, before the arrival of the Spanish conquistadors in the sixteenth century.

References

Further reading

 

Mayan chiefdoms of the Yucatán Peninsula